Palace of Mirrors is the fifth studio album by Estradasphere.

Palace of Mirrors may also refer to:
 Palace of Mirrors, a companion book to Just Ella authored by Margaret Peterson Haddix
 Sheesh Mahal, a  UNESCO World Heritage Site in Lahore Fort built during the reign of Mughal Emperor Shah Jahan in 1631–32.